Archibald Campbell may refer to:

Peerage 
 Archibald Campbell of Lochawe (died before 1394), Scottish peer
 Archibald Campbell, 2nd Earl of Argyll (died 1513), Lord Chancellor of Scotland
 Archibald Campbell, 4th Earl of Argyll (c. 1507–1558), Scottish nobleman and politician
 Archibald Campbell, 5th Earl of Argyll (1532/7–1573), Scottish politician
 Archibald Campbell, 7th Earl of Argyll (c. 1575–1638), Scottish politician and military leader
 Archibald Campbell, 1st Marquess of Argyll (1607–1661), Scottish nobleman, politician, and peer
 Archibald Campbell, 9th Earl of Argyll (1629–1685), Scottish peer
 Archibald Campbell, 1st Duke of Argyll (1658–1703), Scottish peer
 Archibald Campbell, 3rd Duke of Argyll (1682–1761), Scottish nobleman, politician, lawyer, businessman and soldier

Politicians 
 Archibald Campbell (Glasgow MP) (died 1838), of Blythswood, MP for Perth Burghs, 1818–1820, and Glasgow Burghs, 1806–1809 and 1820–1831
 Archibald Campbell (New York politician) (1779–1856), NY politician
 Archibald Campbell, 1st Baron Blythswood (1835–1908), Scottish Conservative politician, MP for Renfrewshire
 Sir Archibald Campbell, 3rd Baronet (1825–1866), British politician, MP for Argyllshire, 1851–1857
 Archibald Campbell (Canadian politician) (1845–1913), Canadian Member of Parliament
 Archibald McIntyre Campbell (1851–1935), member of the Manitoba legislature
 Archibald Campbell (Australian politician) (1834–1903), New South Wales politician
 Archibald Campbell (Alberta politician) (1862–1943), Member of the Alberta legislature
 Archibald Campbell (Wisconsin politician), member of the Wisconsin State Senate

Military 
 Sir Archibald Campbell, 1st Baronet (1769–1843), Scottish soldier and governor of New Brunswick
 Archibald Campbell (British Army officer, born 1739) (1739–1791), American Revolutionary War soldier
 Archibald Campbell (British Army officer, born 1774) (1774–1838), British Army major-general and Lieutenant Governor of Jersey

Others 
 Archibald Campbell (philosopher) (1691–1756), Scottish moral philosopher
 Archibald Campbell (notary) (1790–1862), seigneur and notary in Lower Canada
 Archibald Campbell (doctor) (1805–1874), Superintendent of Darjeeling sanitarium
 Archibald Campbell (died 1868) (1809–1868), formerly Archibald Douglas of Mains
 Archibald Campbell (cricketer) (1822–1887), English cricketer
 Archibald Campbell (satirist) (fl. 1767), Scottish satirist
 Archibald Campbell (bishop) (died 1744), Scottish Episcopal Bishop of Aberdeen
 Sir Archibald Campbell, 2nd Baronet (1769–1846), Scottish advocate and judge
 Lord Archibald Campbell (1846–1913), antiquary and author of Waifs and Strays of Celtic Tradition; second son of the 8th Duke of Argyll.
 Archibald James Campbell (1853–1929), Australian ornithologist
 Archibald George Campbell (1880–1954), Australian ornithologist
 A. Y. G. Campbell (1872–1957), Indian civil servant
 A. Y. Campbell (1885–1958), classical scholar

See also
 Archie Campbell (disambiguation)